Jezkazgan, or Zhezkazgan, formerly known as Dzhezkazgan until 1992, is a city and the administrative centre of Ulytau Region, Kazakhstan, on a reservoir of the Kara-Kengir River. Population:   Its urban area includes the neighbouring mining town of Satpayev, for a total city population of 148,700.

55% of Jezkazgan's population are Kazakhs and 30% Russians, with smaller minorities of Ukrainians, Germans, Chechens and Koreans.

Geography and climate
Jezkazgan is situated in the very heart of the Kazakh upland. It is also near the geographic center of the country. It has an extremely continental cold semi-arid climate (Köppen BSk); rain is frequent but never heavy and monthly rainfall has never reached .

History
The city was created in 1938 in connection with the exploitation of the rich copper deposits. In 1973, a large mining and metallurgical complex was constructed to the southeast to smelt the copper that until then had been sent elsewhere for processing. Other metal ores mined and processed locally are manganese and iron. Also in 1973, the city became the administrative center of the newly formed Dzhezkazgan Oblast, created out of Karaganda Oblast. In 1997, Dzhezkazgan (at this point Jezkazgan) Oblast was liquidated and the city became part of Karaganda Oblast once again. On 16 March, 2022, It was announced by Kazakh President Kassym-Jomart Tokayev that Jezkazgan would become the administrative center of the new Ulytau Region. His decree came into force on 8 June, 2022, thus making Jezkazgan the administrative center of a Region once again.

During the Soviet era, Jezkazgan was the site of a Gulag labor camp, Kengir, mentioned in Aleksandr Solzhenitsyn's book The Gulag Archipelago, and Alexander Dolgun's "An American In The Gulag", and the period of forced resettlement of Koreans from the Russian Far East.

Industry
Today the city is the headquarters of the copper conglomerate Kazakhmys, the city's main employer. The company has subsidiaries in China, Russia and the United Kingdom and is listed on the London Stock Exchange. There is a power station, Kazakhmys Power Plant, with generation capacity of 207 MW and a 220-meter-tall main chimney.

Transport
Jezkazgan has a rail line to the regional capital city Karaganda.

Jezkazgan is connected by road to Karaganda via European route E018 and Kyzylorda and Arkalyk via European route E123. The city is accessible by air via the Zhezkazgan Airport.

Soyuz emergency landings
The Soyuz 33 spacecraft returning cosmonauts from outer space landed in the remote flat countryside surrounding Jezkazgan in 1979.

Again on 11 October 2018 the Soyuz MS-10/56S landed near Jezkazgan when a booster failed during launch.

Luna 16's samples from the moon returned close to here on 24 September 1970.

Economical and ecological challenges
Zhezkazgan is a monocity. The city is economically unstable since the city functions only because of one enterprise (resource), which constrains its development.  Zhezkazgan has a great potential to become the logistics center of Kazakhstan, as it connects North and South, West, and East. Raw materials and people can be transported more efficiently through the Zhezkazgan via transit. But infrastructure and roads do not allow it. The profit of Zhezkazgan is mainly spent on the development of such large cities as Nur-Sultan, Almaty, Karaganda, etc. And a small percentage is used by Zhezkazgan itself. Monotowns are very dependent on their enterprise and price fluctuations in the world market. Changes in these aspects can lead to severe economic problems in the city. 
Civil servants have understood this and are trying to create and develop different sources of income. For example, “Zhezkazgan-Beyneu” was built to link Europe and the Persian Gulf and export products.  The railway line connects West and East, North and South, creating an opportunity for tourists to visit Zhezkazgan. Investments must also be made in green technologies and methods to meet international standards.

In Zhezkazgan, falling water levels, poor drinking water quality, and air pollution damage the health of urban residents and the environment. According to KAZHYDROMET RMK, air pollution in Zhezkazgan is very high.   And the Kengir reservoir has class 5 pollution, which is the highest indicator.   Sulfurous anhydride, carbon monoxide, nitrogen oxide in a gaseous and liquid state can be found in huge quantities in the atmosphere. But the amount of these harmful gases is becoming less and less every year. For example, the emission of these gases decreased by 33.7% in the period 2012-2016.  The factories in Zhezkazgan are located in the South, West, and East of the city. In the area of these plants, you can find a high concentration of inorganic dust (which contains sulfuric copper, lead sulfide), nitrogen oxide, sulfur dioxide, carbon monoxide, coal dust, parts of zinc, lead, copper and aluminum, wood dust, hydrogen sulfide, carbon-sulfur, etc. 
Mostly people from the eastern and southern parts of the city suffer from this the most. The factories are located very close to the town, which violates international sanitary and environmental standards. The farthest factory is located 4900 meters, and the closest one is 500 meters from the city.  This pollutes the water, air, soil of the earth and causes disease among residents.

People associated with Jezkazgan

 Pyotr Klimuk, cosmonaut (an honorary citizen, not a local)
 Kaisar Nurmagambetov, flatwater canoer
 Vitaliy Savin, former Soviet athlete
 Oleg Yankovsky, Russian actor
 Sergei Zhukov, Russian cosmonaut

References

External links
City website 
Photos of the city

 
 

Cities and towns in Kazakhstan
Populated places established in 1938
Populated places in Karaganda Region
Cities and towns built in the Soviet Union
1938 establishments in the Soviet Union
Ulytau Region